Lothar von Richthofen, younger brother of Red Baron Manfred von Richthofen, was a German flying ace credited with 40 confirmed victories in just 77 days flying combat. As the primary arena for aerial combat on the Western Front was over the German trenches and rear works, German aerial and ground observers could usually verify German victories such as Lothar's in considerable detail. The aviation historians cited have further researched his victory claims.

List of victories

Confirmed victories in this list are numbered and listed chronologically. Listings of single casualties are obviously of pilots. In victories over an air crew, pilot casualties are listed first, then the observer(s).

This list is complete for entries, though obviously not for all details. Abbreviations from sources utilized were expanded by editor creating this list. Sources: Norman Franks, Frank Bailey, Russell Guest (1993). Above the Lines: The Aces and Fighter Units of the German Air Service, Naval Air Service and Flanders Marine Corps, 1914–1918. Grub Street Publishing, London. , pp. 135–187

References

Aerial victories of Richthofen, Lothar von
Richthofen, Lothar von